Undulambia polystichalis, the leatherleaf fern borer moth, is a moth in the family Crambidae. It is found in Cuba and the south-eastern United States, where it has been recorded from Florida.

The wingspan is 12–15 mm. Adults are on wing from January to May and again from July to November.

The larvae feed on Rumohra adiantiformis.

References

Moths described in 1965
Musotiminae